Line of Credit is a 2014 made in Georgia, it is a comedy-drama film written and directed by Salomé Alexi. It was screened in the Horizons section at the 71st Venice International Film Festival.

Cast 

 Nino Kasradze
 Zanda Ioseliani
 Ana Kacheishvili
 Bacho Chkheidze
 Nino Arsenishvili
 Tamar Mamulaishvili
 David Darchia
 Giorgi Kipiani
 Tatuli Dolidze
 Tamaz Tevzadze
 Liza Kalandaze

References

External links

2014 films
French comedy-drama films
2014 comedy-drama films
2014 directorial debut films
Comedy-drama films from Georgia (country)
2010s French films